Elections to Watford Borough Council were held on 6 May 1999. The whole council was up for election with boundary changes since the last election in 1998. The Labour party stayed in overall control of the council.

Election result

Ward results

Callowland

Central

Holywell

Leggatts

Meriden

Nascot

Oxhey

Park

Stanborough

Tudor

Vicarage

Woodside

References
1999 Watford election result

1999
1999 English local elections
1990s in Hertfordshire